The J. J. Bridges House is a historic house located at 704 South Kuhl Avenue in Orlando, Florida. It is locally significant as the first of the highly academic Colonial Revival style homes built in the city.

Description and history 
The house was designed by John H. & Wilson C. Ely, and built in 1916. It was added to the National Register of Historic Places on January 26, 1984.

References

External links

 Orange County listings at National Register of Historic Places
 Orange County listings at Florida's Office of Cultural and Historical Programs

Gallery

Buildings and structures in Orlando, Florida
Houses on the National Register of Historic Places in Florida
History of Orlando, Florida
National Register of Historic Places in Orange County, Florida
Houses in Orange County, Florida
Colonial Revival architecture in Florida
Houses completed in 1916